Heathrow Southern Railway is a proposed new railway in the United Kingdom which would link Heathrow Airport to railway lines south of London. The scheme, announced in August 2017, is promoted by Heathrow Southern Railway Limited and would be financed privately. In a government paper published in November 2019, the project has been officially called SAtH - Southern Access to Heathrow. The reason given is that it is not only heavy rail access that is being considered but other transport options too.

The proposals are similar to an earlier scheme, Heathrow Airtrack.

Heathrow Southern Railway would open between 2025 and 2027. The estimated capital cost is between £1.3bn and £1.6bn. The scheme has been put forward in response to the Department for Transport's invitation for proposals from private investors for a southern rail link to Heathrow.

Heathrow Southern Railway Limited 

Heathrow Southern Railway Limited is a private limited company registered in London. It was founded on 16 June 2016 with the aim of bidding for improved rail access to Heathrow Airport. The company states that its proposals would improve public transport capacity and help to reduce traffic congestion and pollution.

The company's founding member was transport planner Steven Costello, and the company board is chaired by Baroness Jo Valentine.

Proposed route 

The proposed route starts in a short section of tunnel from the west end of Terminal 5 station, then rises briefly to the surface to make a connection with the Windsor-Staines Line, with the main route continuing in tunnel following the M25 corridor to connect to existing railway near Chertsey or Virginia Water.

Services from Heathrow towards Woking would use the existing Byfleet Junction, enabling trains to join the South Western Main Line "slow lines" between there and Woking. The junction at Byfleet already has a dive-under, avoiding any delays to trains on the intensively used "fast lines".

Heathrow Southern Railway claims best journey times from Heathrow to Woking of 16 minutes; Guildford 26 minutes; and Basingstoke 40 minutes.

Overall, construction of the new infrastructure can be carried out with minimal impact on existing railway operations. The only impacts would be the new junctions on the Staines – Windsor and Egham – Weybridge routes, both of which are lightly-used lines compared to the South Western Main Line.

Network Rail estimates that there needs to be an additional 60% capacity to serve the expanding Heathrow Airport by 2043 and identified that there is a strong case for implementing a new southern route to meet these needs.

The proposed Heathrow Southern Railway infrastructure also allows for trains from Basingstoke, Woking and Guildford to continue beyond Heathrow Airport to serve a proposed new station at Old Oak Common where there will from 2026 be an interchange with HS2, and also London Paddington which is now  on the Elizabeth line.  This will also increase accessibility into London from the south and south-west, mainly increasing access to Waterloo and Clapham Junction, while also allowing for new routes such as the Basingstoke to Paddington route and a possible route into Southampton in the future. Using Network Rail's modelling system it has been determined that this new line will be able to carry four trains per hour. Heathrow Southern Railway also recognises that if an extra platform were constructed at Staines station their proposed new infrastructure creates an opportunity for an extension of the Elizabeth Line from Heathrow to Staines, which would create another route from Staines into London.

Funding 

Heathrow Southern Railway intends that the planned route will be financed privately, with ownership remaining in the private sector during and after the development process. Heathrow Southern Railway claims that the scheme in operation does not need financial support from the tax payer. While being owned by Heathrow Southern Railway the infrastructure is subject to regulation by the Office of Rail and Road (ORR), and the operation and maintenance of the route could be contracted out to other corporations.

See also 
 Heathrow Airport transport proposals
 Expansion of Heathrow Airport
 Heathrow Express, the current rail link to the airport, connecting it with London Paddington station
 Western Rail Approach to Heathrow

References

External links
 
 British Registrar

Proposed railway lines in England
Southern